Daniel Jacobus Rossouw (born 5 June 1978) is a South African former professional rugby union footballer who played as a second row forward or back row forward. He played for the Bulls in the Super Rugby competition. Rossouw made his provincial debut during 1999 for the Blue Bulls in a match against the North Western Province in the Currie Cup competition. In 2001 he made his Super 12 (now Super Rugby) debut for the Bulls against the Cats.

Rossouw made his first international appearance in the Springboks' opening pool game against Uruguay at the 2003 Rugby World Cup in Australia. He scored a try in the game as well. He did not play in the subsequent match against England, but returned for the game against Georgia, scoring two tries. He played in all the remaining matches until South Africa were knocked out by All Blacks in the quarterfinals.

Rossouw was picked as first-choice Number 8 for the Springboks in their successful world cup campaign of 2007. This was a result of Pierre Spies' unfortunate illness, however Rossouw would no doubt have featured in the squad regardless. His performances included a try in the semifinal against Argentina. He received what looked like a campaign ending injury in the pool clash with Tonga as he was carried off the field with a neck injury. However he recovered and played an important part in the rest of the Springboks march to victory, including a try-saving tackle on Mark Cueto in the final.

Rossouw has won 3 Currie Cup titles, 3 Super Rugby titles, a Japanese title and cup, a Heineken Cup, a Top 14 French Title,  a Tri-Nations title, a World Cup and a series victory over the British and Irish Lions. Now one of the most decorated players in world rugby.

Honours
Blue Bulls
Currie Cup: 2004, 2009

Bulls
Super Rugby: 2007, 2009, 2010

South Africa
World Cup: 2007
Tri-Nations: 2009
British & Irish Lions: 2009

Suntory Sungoliath
Japan Top League: 2011-2012, 2012–2013
All Japan Championship 2012
Toulon
Heineken Cup European Champions: 2013, 2014
Top 14 French League : 2014

References

External links
 Springbok information

1978 births
Living people
Afrikaner people
South African rugby union players
South Africa international rugby union players
Bulls (rugby union) players
Blue Bulls players
Tokyo Sungoliath players
South African expatriate rugby union players
Expatriate rugby union players in France
Expatriate rugby union players in Japan
South African expatriate sportspeople in France
South African expatriate sportspeople in Japan
RC Toulonnais players
Rugby union flankers
Rugby union locks
Rugby union number eights
Rugby union players from Mpumalanga